Billy Backus, (born March 5, 1943 in Canastota, New York) is a former World Welterweight Champion professional boxer. In the summer of 2006 Backus retired from his correctional facility job and moved to South Carolina.

Early boxing career 

Backus, who is the nephew of boxing legend and former world champion Carmen Basilio, started his career by winning only 7 of his first 19 bouts. In 1964, things looked promising when he won four bouts in a row, but then he suffered a three fight losing streak. At this point of his career, he had a record of 8 wins, 7 losses and 3 draws and he retired from boxing. To make things worse, he had lost his last fight, against Rudy Richardson, on his twenty-second birthday.

Rise to prominence 

Backus resumed his boxing career in 1966, but probably never in his wildest dreams could he have envisioned what happened next: in his comeback bout, he knocked out Tod Purtell in the first round, and that marked his embarcation on a seven-fight winning streak that included avenging an earlier loss to Dick French. That streak was broken by a defeat at the hands of Percy Pugh in New Orleans, but soon he started on another winning streak, eight in a row, including two over Pugh. Then, Pugh broke his winning streak once again, beating him in 15 rounds, once again at New Orleans. After splitting two fights with Jerry Pellegrini and drawing in four rounds with Ricky Ortiz, Backus embarked on another winning streak, including an eight-round knockout over Ortiz in a rematch.

World Welterweight Title Bout 

After that last streak, Backus was ranked among the top ten Welterweight challengers of the world at number 10. The year was 1970 and Mexico's José Nápoles had earned the right to make an optional defense of his world title (meaning he could pick any challenger among the top ten to defend against).  His management, figuring they'd have an easy fight ahead of them, picked Backus as the challenger for this optional title bout. But Backus landed a punch that opened a cut over Nápoles' eye in round one, causing Nápoles to bleed profusely, and the fight was stopped in round four. Since the cut had been ruled to be caused by a punch, Backus was declared winner by a technical knockout, and he had realized a dream that many fans never thought he would: he had become the world's Welterweight champion. His uncle Basilio, watching from ringside, said: "Billy winning the world title is the best thing ever to happen in my life, even better than me winning the world title."

Billy won two non-title fights, including one over Robert Gallois in Paris, and then had a rematch with Nápoles in Los Angeles.  This time Nápoles returned the favor, knocking Backus out in the eighth round and regaining his title.

Career decline 

He finished 1971 with a ten-round decision win over Jose Gabino, and went 3–2 in 1972, losing two fifteen-round decisions to world title challenger Hedgemon Lewis. He lost 3 of 4 bouts in 1973, and went on a European tour in 1974, winning 2 and losing 2 in Paris and Berlin. In 1975, he went to Australia and lost by a knockout in five to Rocky Mattioli, and then he came back to the States, where he beat Marc Gervais by a knockout in ten. This marked the start of another 9 fight winning streak, which led the WBA to make him their number one challenger. After drawing in twelve rounds with Everaldo Acosta Acevedo, he had a chance at regaining the world welterweight title when faced against world champion Pipino Cuevas of Mexico, once again in Los Angeles. After losing by quitting on his stool in the first round, Backus then announced his retirement from boxing for good.

Although he isn't a member of the International Boxing Hall Of Fame (unlike his uncle Basilio, who is), in 1990, Ed Brophy and some Canastota businessmen came up with the idea to build the hall of fame in Canastota, to honor Canastota's two native world champions: Basilio and Backus.

In 2010, the award nominated "Title Town USA, Boxing in Upstate New York" by noted historian Mark Allen Baker was published by The History Press in 2010 and supports Canastota, New York as the epicenter of Upstate New York's rich boxing heritage. The book includes chapters on both Carmen Basilio  and Billy Backus. The introduction was written by Edward P. Brophy, Executive Director of the International Boxing Hall of Fame .

Backus had a final record of 48 wins, 20 losses and 5 draws, with 22 wins by knockout.

Professional boxing record

See also
List of world welterweight boxing champions

References

External links

 

|- 

1943 births
Living people
American male boxers
People from Canastota, New York
Boxers from New York (state)
Welterweight boxers
World welterweight boxing champions
World Boxing Association champions
World Boxing Council champions
The Ring (magazine) champions